Campsis grandiflora, commonly known as the Chinese trumpet vine, is a fast-growing, deciduous creeper with large, orange, trumpet-shaped flowers in summer. It can grow to a height of 10 meters. A native of East Asia, it is less hardy than its relative Campsis radicans.

Campsis grandiflora prefers moist, nutrient-rich soil and a position with full sun and support to climb. The dark green leaves have serrated edges.

References

External links
 

grandiflora
Flora of China
Flora of Japan
Flora of Korea
Plants described in 1894